The Dundas Real McCoys are a Canadian senior ice hockey team based in Dundas, Ontario. They play in the Ontario Hockey Association's Major League Hockey.

The Real McCoys have won two National Championships, winning the 1986 Hardy Cup as Canadian Senior "AA" Champions and hosting and winning the 2014 Allan Cup as Canadian Senior "AAA" Champions.

History
The Real McCoys were once members of the Major Intermediate A Hockey League as the Dundas Merchants, and as the Dundas-Hamilton Tigers. The Tigers won the J. Ross Robertson Cup in 1985 as the league's playoffs champions.

In 1986, the Real McCoys were the last Ontario Hockey Association team to win the Hardy Cup as National Senior "AA"/Intermediate "A" Champions.  Only two OHA teams ever won this award, the other was the Georgetown Raiders. The Real McCoys played one year independent after the OHA Sr. League folded in 1987.  After faltering in the first round of the national playoffs in 1988, the McCoys folded.

In 2000, the Real McCoys were resurrected in Major League Hockey and have played there ever since. The Real McCoys won the J. Ross Robertson Cup as playoffs champions in 2002, 2003, 2009, 2010, 2011 and 2012.

Season-by-season record
Note: GP = Games played, W = Wins, L = Losses, T = Ties, OTL = Overtime losses, Pts = Points, GF = Goals for, GA = Goals against

Notable alumni
Matthew Barnaby
Ryan Christie
Dan Currie
Bruce Dowie
Todd Harvey
Todd Hlushko
Mark Jooris
Mike Kennedy
Bob LaForest
Jeff MacMillan
Bill McDougall
Mike Millar
Chris Pusey
Nick Smith
Rick Vaive
Scott Walker
Stan Weir
Jason Williams

References

External links
Real McCoys Homepage

Ice hockey teams in Hamilton, Ontario
Senior ice hockey teams
1964 establishments in Ontario
Ice hockey clubs established in 1964